Le Cancre is a 2016 French film directed and written by Paul Vecchiali. With this film, Paul Vecchiali shows the story of a man who revisits his past as much as that of a filmmaker who revisits a whole part of French cinema.

Plot
The film follows the adversarial relationship between a father and son, both incurably emotional. The father is haunted by the memory of Marguerite, the great love of his youth, and he lives only in the hope of finding her. The son however is somewhat lost in his life, and later takes the measure of his attachment to his grandfather.

Cast

 Catherine Deneuve as Marguerite 
 Paul Vecchiali as Rodolphe
 Mathieu Amalric as Boris
 Édith Scob as Sarah
 Annie Cordy as Christiane
 Françoise Lebrun as Valentine
 Françoise Arnoul as Mimi
 Pascal Cervo as Laurent
 Noël Simsolo as Ferdinand
 Raphaël Neal as Alex
 Pierre Sénélas as Pierre
 Marianne Basler as Suzanne

Production
The film started shooting on 5 October 2015.

Release 
The movie was released in 2016. It was nominated at the Cannes Film Festival in 2016.

References

External links
 
 

2016 films
2016 drama films
French drama films
2010s French-language films
Films directed by Paul Vecchiali
2010s French films